is a Japanese politician who served as Minister of Digital Affairs, Minister for Digital Reform, Minister in charge of Administrative Reforms, Minister in charge of Civil Service Reform and Minister of State for Regulatory Reform in the First Kishida Cabinet. A member of the Liberal Democratic Party, she has been a member of the House of Representatives from the Kanagawa 17th district since 2012.

Makishima was born in Yokosuka, Kanagawa. Her father was an assistant to representative Junichiro Koizumi and stood as a proportional representation candidate in the 1998 House of Councillors election. She received her bachelor's and doctorate from International Christian University and master's from George Washington University.

She ran for the Kanagawa 17th district seat in the 2009 election, but lost to DPJ candidate Yosuke Kamiyama. She defeated Kamiyama to win the seat in the 2012 election.

References

External links
 Official site

Members of the House of Representatives (Japan)
Liberal Democratic Party (Japan) politicians
International Christian University alumni
George Washington University alumni
1976 births
Living people
The Graduate School of Political Management alumni
Government ministers of Japan
Women government ministers of Japan